Erismatica is a genus of moths in the family Sesiidae. Erismatica contains a single species, Erismatica erythropis, which can be found in Zimbabwe.

References

Endemic fauna of Zimbabwe
Lepidoptera of Zimbabwe
Moths of Sub-Saharan Africa
Sesiidae